Palitchoke Ayanaputra (born August 9, 1984) is a Thai singer.

Biography 
Palitchoke Ayanaputra or Peck was born on August 9, 1984, in Bangkok, Thailand. He lived in Australia for 7 years during his childhood. After Palitchoke moved back to Thailand, he started his career in the music and entertainment industry as an artist trainee under GMM Grammy. During the training, he was a television host for Disney Club, the children's show that aired every weekend morning between 2002 and 2007. It took him between six and seven years for his first solo single, "Mai Me Krai Ru(ไม่มีใครรู้)", to release in 2005 as part of One Man Story music album. Then, in the same year, he released his first album One Palitchoke.

Education
He attended Cabramatta Public School in Australia for kindergarten and elementary school for 7 years before moving back to Bangkok, Thailand. During high school, he studied at Ekamai International School, Triam Udom Suksa Nomklao School, and Navamintarajinutit Triam Udom Nomklao School (in English-French Program). He graduated from Srinakharinwirot University with a Bachelor of Fine and Applied Arts Program in Music major. Currently, he studies Master of Arts (Tourism and Hospitality Business Management) at Rangsit University.

Music And Entertainment career

In year 2001, Palitchoke started voice acting with the role of Percy Weasley in the first Harry Potter film. After that, in 2002, he appeared as a member of G-BOYZ, boy band under GMM Grammy label with another 2 members, Rattapoom Toekongsap and Bank Pisit Khamyod and covered 2 songs from Teen Talk album: "Yim Yim (ยิ้ม ยิ้ม)" (Original singer: Sriphan Chunechomboon) and "Mai Ru Ja Luak Krai (ไม่รู้จะเลือกใคร)" (Original singer: Shahkrit Yamnam). In 2005, Palitchoke released his first solo single "Mai Mee Krai Ru(ไม่มีใครรู้)" (Nobody Knows) from the album "One Man Story #1". Also in the same year, he released his first album "One Palitchoke" with songs such as "Rue Kae Kum Kum(หรือแค่ขำ ๆ)", "Jai Nueng Kor Rak Eek Jai Kor Jeb(ใจหนึ่งก็รักอีกใจก็เจ็บ)" and "Ni Tan Hing Hoi(นิทานหิ่งห้อย)". He followed with "One Man Story No. 2, Album: Love Passion" in 2007, including the song "Choo Nai Jai(ชู้ในใจ)". In the same year, he released his second solo album "I'm in Love".

In 2008, he formed the trio band "Peck-Aof-Ice" with Aof Pongsak and Ice Saranyu. Their first album was Together: Peck-Aof-Ice including the song "Kae Kon Tor Pid" (แค่คนโทรผิด) Along with "Mai Rak Ya Tam Hai Kid(ไม่รักอย่าทำให้คิด)" as his solo song in this album. In February 2010, Palitchoke announced his new label "เอ็กแซ็กท์ (Exact Music)" to the media. Two years later, in 2012, he signed again with the Humbrella label under GMM Grammy and released his third album "Let's Move" in the same year which included songs such as "Took Kon Laew(ถูกคนแล้ว), "Laew Tae Hua Jai Ter(แล้วแต่หัวใจเธอ)", "San Ya Mai Pen San Ya(สัญญาไม่เป็นสัญญา)", "Mai Rak Ya Fuen(ไม่รัก.. อย่าฝืน)". In 2016, Palitchoke released the single  "Yak Hai Waw Ta Chan Pen Kon Ern" (Why) (อยากให้แววตาฉันเป็นคนอื่น (Why)).
 
Alongside his singing career, in 2014, Palitchoke joined the Thai television series "The Trainer: the fifth season" as a coach/trainer on the children's singing reality competition on Channel 3.  He was a host on  Disney Club, the children's television show TV show on Ch7 which broadcast every weekend morning during 2002 – 2007. He was also a host on  "Wake Club" the teenagers television program every weekend morning on Ch5 in 2002. He was also a voice actor for films including roles such as Percy Weasley in the Harry Potter films since 2001, as Peter Pan in Peter Pan 2: Return to Never Land, a 2002 animated film produced by Walt Disney Television Animation, as well as "Mumble", the main protagonist in Happy Feet in 2006.

In 2017, Palitchoke joined "The Mask Singer Thailand (season 1)" as one of the contestants under the kangaroo mask. He performed songs such as Versace on the Floor, Empire State of Mind, Love On Top, How Am I Supposed to Live Without You and One Last Cry and become the winner of Group D during on-air period between January – March 2017. Later, he released the single "Tod Tee Aow tae Jai" (Sorry) (โทษที่เอาแต่ใจ) on July 10, 2017. For this song he received the awards: Favorite Asian Music Videos Of 2017 from MTV Fan Picks 20 by MTV ASIA, Best Solo Star from SBS Pop Asia Awards held by SBS(Special Broadcasting Service) Television of Australia in December 2017, and Song Of The Year from YES AWARDS held by YES R&B karaoke as of December 25, 2017.

In 2017, he received awards such as Comeback Kid Award from GQ Men of the Year 2017 on August 23, 2017, the Standard Most Popular Person of the year 2017 and Thailand Headlines Person of the Year Award 2016–2017 on July 3, 2017. He was also selected by the Thai Embassy to perform in the Thai Festival in Japan in May 2017 with fellow artists. Palitchoke performed in various 2017 concerts with All-4-One, iKON and BNK48. On December 16, 2017, he released the R&B single "This Is Love" (นี่แหละความรัก).

Discography

Sololist albums 

 *= notable songs

Single 

 (*)= notable songs

Other albums 

 *= notable songs

OST

Filmography

Voice Actor

TV Host

Series
 as JP in The Extra วงการร้าย วงการรัก(2016)

Concerts

Awards And Achievement

References 

Palitchoke Ayanaputra
Palitchoke Ayanaputra
Living people
1984 births
Palitchoke Ayanaputra